Helen Field Comstock (Field; pen name, Zeleta; September 3, 1840 – January 28, 1930) was an American poet and philanthropist. Her poems were collected and published in a large volume.

Early life and education
Helen Maria Field was born September 3, 1840, in Chesterfield, New Hampshire. She was the oldest of the three living children of Jesse and Hannah Field. The genealogy of the Field family went back to the early colonial times, when three brothers came from England to what became the United States, and settled in Taunton, Massachusetts, where many of their descendants stayed. The father's health was poor due to an unfortunate fall early in life, which ultimately caused his death in 1850, at the age of 39, when Helen was nine years old.

The widow kept her children in school, including the public schools and the academy in Chesterfield. When Helen was fifteen, she received a certificate to teach.

Career
On 2 Jan 1862, in Shelburne Falls, Massachusetts, she married Ransford A. Comstock (d. 1891), a native of that town. Here, they made their home for ten years. Their two sons were born, in 1862 and 1867. In 1870, Mrs. Comstock removed to Rochelle, Illinois, which was her home thereafter.

For a time, she wrote under the pen name, "Zeleta", later "Helen M. Comstock", and still later, everything for publication was signed "Helen Field Comstock". Her poems appeared in various periodicals in New England and the West. She was a writer for the Chicago Tribune and other leading publications of the east and west. Her poems were incorporated in Poets of America and other standard works. They were also collected and published in a large volume, which received favorable reviews. Though she had a rather low and weak voice, Comstock was comfortable with public speaking.

Death
Comstock died at the home of her son, D. A. Comstock, in DeKalb, Illinois, January 28, 1930. Interment was made in Rochelle's Lawnridge cemetery.

References

Attribution
 
 

1840 births
1930 deaths
20th-century American writers
19th-century American women writers
20th-century American women writers
19th-century American poets
20th-century American poets
American philanthropists
People from Chesterfield, New Hampshire
Pseudonymous women writers
19th-century pseudonymous writers
20th-century pseudonymous writers